Baader Bank AG is an investment bank located in Unterschleißheim, Germany.

History
In 1983, Uto Baader founded Baader Bank AG as a stockbroker at the Munich Stock Exchange. Presently, Uto Baader is the majority stakeholder in Baader Bank AG.

References

External links
 Official Website

Banks of Germany
Companies based in Bavaria